Leivatho is a former municipality on the island of Kefalonia, Ionian Islands, Greece. Since the 2019 local government reform it is part of the municipality Argostoli, of which it is a municipal unit. It lies south of Argostoli, on the central south coast of the island, and has a land area of 62.626 km² and a population of 5,745 (2011 census). Its largest towns are Peratáta (751), Svoronáta (pop. 710), Vlacháta (699), and Lakithra (613).

Subdivisions
The municipal unit Leivatho is subdivided into the following communities (constituent villages in brackets):
 Kerameies (seat of the former municipality)
 Karavados
 Lakithra (Lakithra, Menegata)
 Lourdata
 Metaxata
 Mousata
 Peratata (Peratata, Kastro)
 Pesada (Pesada, Dorizata, Kountourata)
 Spartia (Spartia, Kleismata, Korianna)
 Svoronata
 Vlachata (Vlachata, Simotata)

See also
List of settlements in Cephalonia

References

Populated places in Cephalonia